MV Grigory Lovtsov was a Russian roll-on/roll-off cargo ship which became stuck in the ice and lost in the Sea of Okhotsk in January 2022.

Description 
Made of steel, the vessel was propelled by a single diesel engine, shaft, and screw.

History 
Grigory Lovtsov was built in Japan in 2002 by Watanabe Zosen K. K., who gave it the yard number 102.

On 4 January 2022, the ship was transiting through the waters of the Shantar Islands in the Sea of Okhotsk when it became stuck in the ice and suffered a power outage. The ship's captain issued a distress signal and ordered the crew to abandon ship, and the Russian Ministry of Emergency Situations dispatched an Mi-8 helicopter to perform an evacuation of the crew. By 0800 the next day, all eight crew had been successfully evacuated and airlifted to safety in Nkolayevsk, Khabarovsk Krai, without any injuries. The vessel was left to drift with the ice flows.

References 

2002 ships
Maritime incidents in 2022
Cargo ships of Russia